An election of Members of the European Parliament representing Malta constituency for the 2004–2009 term was held on 12 June 2004 as part of the wider 2004 European election. The election used Single Transferable Vote. The opposition Malta Labour Party polled strongly.

Results

Elected MEPs

Results by candidate

External links
All 18 rounds of counting

Malta
European Parliament elections in Malta
2004 in Malta